Shed Productions, part of Warner Bros. Television Productions UK, was an independent UK television production company, specialising in contemporary, original drama programming and content. It was established in 1998 by Eileen Gallagher, Brian Park, Ann McManus and Maureen Chadwick, who previously worked together at Granada Television. As of October 2015 it no longer exists as a company with all properties folded into Wall to Wall.

Company history
Shed's first major production, the hit drama Bad Girls was commissioned by ITV in the summer of 1998 and proved to be a huge success with viewers, becoming one of the UK's most consistently successful dramas during its eight series run.

In 2000, following the success of Bad Girls, Shed won a major new commission for primetime ITV, Footballers' Wives. During the five series it was on air, Footballers' Wives became probably the most talked-about UK drama of recent times and spawned the popular ITV2 spin-off Footballers' Wives Extra Time, and factual entertainment series Footballers' Wives TV which aired on ITV2 in 2005.

2005 also saw Shed's first foray into the realms of children's television when seven-part drama The Fugitives was commissioned by CITV. Starring Maureen Lipman, Jack Ellis and Melanie Hill, the show centred on two runaway teenagers and tackled head-on the serious subject of human cloning.

In 2006, Shed received its first commission from BBC One, Waterloo Road, a drama series about a failing comprehensive school in Rochdale. After proving to be a huge hit with viewers, especially the valuable 16- to 24-year-old audience, Waterloo Road was immediately re-commissioned by the BBC for a second series. Remaining consistently popular with the viewers, seven series of Waterloo Road have so far been aired (as of 2012). In November 2011, it was announced by the BBC and Shed Media that production on the show would be relocating from Rochdale to a new location in Greenock, Scotland as part of the BBC's aim to produce more programming in the country. A further 50 episodes were commissioned for broadcast between 2012 and 2014, with the first to begin airing from September 2012. Filming on the eighth series began in April 2012 at the shows new location, the former Greenock Academy, and began airing from August 2012. Production on a ninth series began on 1 April 2013.
It was announced on 2 April 2014 that series 10 will be the final series of the show. On 23 September 2021, it was announced that Waterloo Road would return with a new series.

One-off drama Catwalk Dogs – written by Men Behaving Badly creator Simon Nye and starring Kris Marshall and Georgia MacKenzie – aired on ITV1 in 2007 and introduced viewers to the world of dog shows. This was followed in 2008 by Rock Rivals, another ITV commission that starred Michelle Collins and Sean Gallagher as Karina and Mal Faith – the bickering judges on a phenomenally successful TV talent show.

In 2008, BBC One commissioned Hope Springs, a new eight-part drama from Shed Productions through BBC Scotland. The show, which will star Annette Crosbie and Alex Kingston, is about four female ex-cons who find themselves in hiding in a remote Scottish village called Hope Springs after their plans to start a new life in Barbados go awry. Filming has begun in summer 2008 in the Lowland village of Wanlockhead. The series began airing on BBC One on Sunday 7 June 2009.

Following on from Hope Springs will be Dirty Something, a drama series set around the lives and loves of Notting Hill Tories.

Productions

Television productions

1. Bombshell has never been broadcast in the UK. It was produced in 2004 and initially intended to air on ITV1 in February 2005; however, it never did. The series first premiered in New Zealand on TV One in 2006.

Other productions
 Bad Girls: Most Wanted (2004)
 Presented by Jack Ellis, this behind-the-scenes special broadcast on ITV2 following the Series Six finale and ranked the top 10 most popular prisoners of the series with additional outtakes, bloopers, and scenes from the then upcoming Bad Girls: The Musical.
 Footballers' Wives: Exposed (2004)
 Behind-the-scenes documentary of the series.
 Catwalk Dogs (2007)
 Television film broadcast on ITV.

US remakes

Football Wives
After Footballers' Wives proved such a hit with US viewers when it was broadcast on BBC America, US network ABC commissioned a pilot for an American version of the show, named Football Wives. Although based on the UK original and using similar plots, the pilot featured American football rather than association football, and a completely new cast, including Lucy Lawless, Gabrielle Union, Eddie Cibrian, Kiele Sanchez, and James Van Der Beek.

The pilot was not picked up due to budget reasons, however a number of websites have speculated that Football Wives was shelved due to potential conflicts with the National Football League.

Bad Girls - The Musical
Bad Girls - The Musical is an original British musical that was developed by the creators of the television series, Maureen Chadwick and Ann McManus, in collaboration with composer and lyricist Kath Gotts, and director Maggie Norris.

Bad Girls – The Musical takes as its starting point the original core characters from the first series of Bad Girls on TV, and loosely follows the storyline of the first series, most notably, the suicide of Rachel Hicks and the relationship between Wing Governor Helen Stewart and inmate Nikki Wade.

Following a successful workshop production in November 2004 at the New Players Theatre, London, the musical went on to premiere at the West Yorkshire Playhouse in Leeds in 2006. The subsequent West End production began previews at the Garrick Theatre in August 2007 and officially opened in September 2007. Despite positive reviews, the musical closed less than two months later due to poor ticket sales, with the final performance staged on 17 November 2007.

Reception

Viewing figures

Awards and nominations

References

External links 

Television production companies of the United Kingdom
Warner Bros.